is a former Japanese football player.

Playing career
Yamaguchi was born in Kumamoto on June 10, 1979. After graduating from high school, he joined J1 League club Kashima Antlers in 1998. However he could not play at all in the match until 2001. Although he also played for J2 League club Oita Trinita in 2000, he could not play at all in the match. In 2002, he moved to Japan Football League (JFL) club Sony Sendai. He played many matches in 3 seasons. In 2005, he moved to his local club Rosso Kumamoto (later Roasso Kumamoto) in Regional Leagues. He played as regular player and the club was promoted to JFL from 2006. In 2007, the club won the 2nd place and was promoted to J2 from 2008. However his opportunity to play decreased from 2008 and retired end of 2009 season.

Club statistics

References

External links

1979 births
Living people
Association football people from Kumamoto Prefecture
Japanese footballers
J1 League players
J2 League players
Japan Football League players
Kashima Antlers players
Oita Trinita players
Sony Sendai FC players
Roasso Kumamoto players
Association football midfielders